Juicero was an American company that designed and manufactured the Juicero Press, a fruit and vegetable juicer. The Juicero Press was a Wi-Fi connected juicer that used proprietary, single-serving packets of pre-chopped fruits and vegetables that were sold exclusively by the company by subscription. From 2014 to 2017, the San Francisco-based firm received $120 million in startup venture capital from investors.

The company attracted significant negative media attention when consumers and journalists discovered that its juice packets could be squeezed just as easily by hand as by the company's expensive machine. On September 1, 2017, the company announced that it was suspending sales of the juicer and the packets, repurchasing the juicer from its customers and searching for a buyer for the company and its intellectual property. After its collapse, the company was described in the press as a symbol of a dysfunctional Silicon Valley culture. The Guardian wrote that Juicero was an example of "the absurd Silicon Valley startup industry that raises huge sums of money for solutions to non-problems."

History
Juicero was founded in 2013 by Doug Evans, who served as CEO until October 2016, when former president of Coca-Cola North America Jeff Dunn took over the position. The company's juicing press was originally priced at $699 when launched in March 2016, but was reduced to $399 in January 2017, 12 to 18 months ahead of schedule, in response to slow sales of the device.

Juicero filed a complaint in federal court in April 2017 against a competing cold-press juicing device, the Froothie Juisir, for allegedly infringing its patent and copying Juicero's trade dress.

Produce packs for the press, containing blends of pulped fruits and vegetables, cost between $5 and $7 and had a limited lifespan of about eight days. Each pack had a QR code which was scanned and verified by the Internet-connected machine before it could be used. CEO Jeff Dunn claimed this was a safety feature to prevent packs from being used past their expiration date, and to facilitate food safety recalls, though critics felt that the feature was a form of digital rights management as it would prevent operation of the press with any produce pack not made by the company. Industrial design for the press was completed by Yves Behar's studio Fuseproject, based in San Francisco.

On September 1, 2017, the company announced that it was suspending sales of the juicer and the packets, repurchasing the juicer from its customers and searching for a buyer for the company and its intellectual property.

Controversies
In 2017, Juicero was the target of widespread criticism when Bloomberg News published a story showing that the company's produce packs could be squeezed by hand easily and effectively, and that hand-squeezing produced juice that was nearly indistinguishable in quantity and quality from the output of the company's expensive Press device. The company defended its product and its process, claiming that squeezing packs by hand created undue mess and promoted a poor user experience, and later offered full refunds to any customers dissatisfied with their Press device. 

After taking apart the device, venture capitalist Ben Einstein considered the press to be "an incredibly complicated piece of engineering", but that the complexity was unnecessary and likely arose from a lack of cost constraints during the design process. A simpler and cheaper implementation, suggested Einstein, would likely have produced much the same quality of juice at a price several hundred US dollars cheaper.

See also 
 Internet of things
 Value proposition

References

External links 
  Archived Official Website, from 7 February 2017
 Archived copy of the notice posted on the Juicero website on 1 September, 2017
 Patent US9493298 B2 - Juicing systems and methods

Food packaging
Food preparation utensils
Kitchenware
Companies based in San Francisco
Manufacturing companies disestablished in 2017
Manufacturing companies established in 2013
2013 establishments in California
2017 disestablishments in California
Juice